Kadir Kamal is a Turkish Greco-Roman wrestler competing in the 67 kg division. He is a member of İstanbul Büyükşehir Belediyesi S.K.

Career 
Kadir Kamal captured silver medal in men's Greco-Roman 67 kg at 2021 European U23 Wrestling Championship.

In November 2021, he won one of the bronze medals in that event at the 2021 U23 World Wrestling Championships held in Belgrade, Serbia.

Kadir Kamal captured the silver medal in men's Greco-Roman 67 kg at 2022 European U23 Wrestling Championships.

References

External links 
 

Turkish male sport wrestlers
Living people
2000 births
21st-century Turkish people